Regalo di Natale, internationally released as Christmas Present, is a 1986 Italian comedy-drama film directed by Pupi Avati. It entered the 43° Venice Film Festival, in which Carlo Delle Piane won the Volpi Cup for Best Actor. For his performance in this film Diego Abatantuono won a Nastro d'Argento for Best supporting Actor. The film has a sequel, Christmas Rematch.

Plot 
The day before Christmas: a group of friends can be found, as tradition, rich in the house of one of them, for a game of poker. Each of the four men, including a mysterious lawyer, has problems in families, and trying to scrape together a Christmas game in a considerable sum in order to live better. But fate has a special plan for each day players.

Cast 
Diego Abatantuono as Franco Mattioli
Gianni Cavina as  Ugo Cavara
Alessandro Haber as  Gabriele Bagnoli
Carlo Delle Piane as  Antonio Sant'Elia
George Eastman as  Stefano Bertoni
 Kristina Sevieri  as  Martina
Rossella Como

See also
 List of Christmas films
 List of Italian films of 1986

References

External links

1986 films
Italian Christmas comedy-drama films
1980s Christmas comedy-drama films
Films about gambling
Films directed by Pupi Avati
Films scored by Riz Ortolani
1980s Italian-language films
1980s Italian films